The Aero AT-3 is a two-seat, low wing, utility aircraft manufactured in Poland by Aero AT in ready-to-fly certificated form and as a kitplane. The aircraft is of conventional configuration and features fixed tricycle undercarriage.  The structure is largely of all-metal construction.  Designed by Tomasz Antoniewski it first flew in 1997 and deliveries to customers commenced in 2002.  It is certified under the European Very Light Aircraft regulations. On July 2, 2010 Aero AT-3 was granted an American Federal Aviation Administration type certificate, based on its European VLA certification.

Design and development
The AT-3 R-100 is a single-engined low-wing cantilever monoplane of all-metal construction and a fixed tricycle landing gear. It is powered by a nose-mounted Bombardier-Rotax 912 with either a two-bladed wooden or three-bladed composite propeller.

Acquisition by Jiangsu LanTian Aerospace Industrial Park of China

In April 2013, the manufacturer of the AT-3 VLA and AT-4 LSA aircraft, Aero AT Sp. z o.o. was acquired by Jiangsu LanTian Aerospace Industrial Park of China. While production for the European and US markets is to remain in Mielec, Poland, a new assembly facility is being developed in China for the local Chinese Market. In early 2014 plans included production of more than 100 aircraft for Chinese customers by the end of 2015.

Operational history
The first Aero AT-3s were supplied to the Aeroclub of Warsaw in Poland in the early 2000s. The first sales outside Poland were to the UK in 2004 (a total of 16 AT-3s have since been sold to the UK).  The aircraft has also proved popular in France with a similar number of sales.  Further examples operate in the Netherlands, Belgium, Germany, Switzerland, Sweden, Spain and Hungary. As of early 2014, approx 70 Aero AT-3 aircraft have been delivered to customers in Europe, North Africa and Asia. Over 20 LSA variants (AT-4) have been supplied to the North American market.  The aircraft are primarily used by flight training organisations with a smaller number of private owners. Variants with glass cockpits and certified for Night VFR have also been delivered in recent years.

Variants
AT-3 SK
Standard Kit, homebuilt variant.
AT-3 R100
Factory-built variant to EASA-VLA standards.
AT-4
Light-sport aircraft version for the US market, also sold as the Gobosh 700.

Specifications (AT-3 R100)

See also

References

External links

 European Aviation Safety Agency – Type Certificate Data Sheet A021

Low-wing aircraft
Homebuilt aircraft
1990s Polish civil utility aircraft
AT-3
Single-engined tractor aircraft
Aircraft first flown in 1997